Ireteba Peaks Wilderness is a 32,745 acre (13,251 ha) wilderness area spanning the area of the southern part of Eldorado Mountains to the northern parts of Lake Mohave. It is located 45 miles (72 km) south of Las Vegas and was designated as a wilderness area in 2002. Iretaba Peaks Wilderness is managed by the National Park Service and the Bureau of Land Management.

Geography 
The peaks were named after one of the leaders of the Mohave tribe, Irataba. Native vegetation in the area includes creosote, yucca, desert willow, and several cacti species. Desert tortoises, Townsend’s big-eared bats, and bighorn sheep can also be found in Iretaba Peaks Wilderness.

See also 

 List of wilderness area in Nevada

References 

Wilderness areas of Nevada
Protected areas of Clark County, Nevada
Bureau of Land Management areas in Nevada